Tim van de Berg (born 23 November 1997) is a Dutch footballer who plays for DHSC.

Club career
He made his professional debut in the Eredivisie for Heracles Almelo on 18 February 2017 in a game against S.B.V. Excelsior.

References

External links
 

Living people
1997 births
People from Maarssen
Association football defenders
Association football midfielders
Dutch footballers
USV Elinkwijk players
Heracles Almelo players
Eredivisie players
DHSC players
Footballers from Utrecht (province)